The Whitehead torpedo was the first self-propelled or "locomotive" torpedo ever developed.  It was perfected in 1866 by Robert Whitehead from a rough design conceived by Giovanni Luppis of the Austro-Hungarian Navy in Fiume. It was driven by a three-cylinder compressed-air engine invented, designed, and made by Peter Brotherhood. Many naval services procured the Whitehead torpedo during the 1870s, including the US Navy. This early torpedo proved itself in combat during the Russo-Turkish War when, on 16 January 1878, the Ottoman ship Intibah was sunk by Russian torpedo boats carrying Whiteheads, though this story has been disputed in one book.

The term "torpedo" comes from the torpedo fish, which is a type of ray that delivers an electric shock to stun its prey.

History

During the 19th century, an officer of the Austrian Marine Artillery conceived the idea of using a small boat laden with explosives, propelled by a steam or an air engine and steered by cables to be used against enemy ships; his papers came into the possession of Captain Giovanni Luppis upon his death. Luppis had a model of the device built; it was powered by a spring-driven clockwork mechanism and steered remotely by cables from land. Dissatisfied with the device, which he called the "coast-saver", Luppis turned to Robert Whitehead, who then worked for Stabilimento Tecnico Fiumano, a factory in Fiume. In about 1850 the Imperial Austrian Navy asked Whitehead to develop this design into a self-propelled underwater torpedo.

In 1868, Whitehead introduced a solution to the stability problem for his torpedo: Pendulum-and-hydrostat control, contained in its Immersion Chamber. The Austrian Navy bought the manufacturing rights to the Whitehead torpedo in 1869. Still, there remained the problem of course correction: returning the torpedo to its correct course after it had deviated due to wind or wave action. The solution was in the form of the gyroscope gear, which was patented by Ludwig Obry, the rights to which was bought by Whitehead in 1896.

Design

The United States Navy started using the Whitehead torpedo in 1892 after an American company, E. W. Bliss, secured manufacturing rights. As manufactured for the US Navy, the Whitehead torpedo was divided into four sections: the head, the air flask, the after-body and the tail. The air flask was constructed from heavy forged steel. The other parts of the shell of the torpedo were made of thin sheet steel. The interior parts were generally constructed out of bronze. The torpedo was launched above or below the waterline from a tube, using air or gunpowder discharge.

Significance
In 1871, the Royal Navy bought manufacturing rights, and started producing the torpedo at the Royal Laboratories at Woolwich, England. The Royal Navy fitted the Whitehead torpedo on its earliest submarines, from  onwards. The French, German, Italian, Russian navies soon followed suit and began acquiring the Whitehead torpedo.

By the 1880s, more of the world's navies acquired the Whitehead and began deploying torpedo boats to carry them into battle and engineers began to envision submarines armed with Whitehead torpedoes. In 1904, British Admiral Henry John May commented, "but for Whitehead, the submarine would remain an interesting toy and little more".

The last known operational use of a Whitehead torpedo was during the Battle of Drøbak Sound on 9 April 1940. Two torpedoes were fired from a torpedo battery in the Oslofjord at the German cruiser . This finished the ship off after it had been severely damaged by cannon fire from Oscarsborg.

Operators

See also
American 18-inch torpedo
Schwartzkopff torpedo
Bliss-Leavitt torpedo
Howell torpedo

References

Explanatory notes

Citations

Bibliography

Unmanned underwater vehicles
Torpedoes of the United States
Whitehead torpedoes